The Wonder That Was India: A Survey of the Culture of the Indian Sub-Continent Before the Coming of the Muslims, is a book on Indian history written by Arthur Llewellyn Basham and first published in 1954.

Synopsis
The book was aimed at a western audience. Basham, in the book, has attempted to correct the negative stereotypes of India created by authors like James Mill, Thomas Babington Macaulay and Vincent Arthur Smith.

Reception
Thomas Trautmann considers this book his primary influence which encouraged him to study India. The foreword of the 2005 edition by Picador was written by him. David Dean Shulman has said that the book fascinated him.

See also
 The Greatness That Was Babylon

References 

1954 non-fiction books
Books about India
History books about India
Sidgwick & Jackson books